The Nudelman N-37 was a 37 mm (1.46 in) aircraft autocannon used by the Soviet Union. It was designed during World War II by V. Ya. Nemenov of A.E. Nudelman's OKB-16 to replace the earlier Nudelman-Suranov NS-37 and entered service in 1946. It was 30% lighter than its predecessor at the cost of a 23% lower muzzle velocity.

The N-37 was a sizable weapon firing a massive (735 g/26 oz HEI-T, 760 g/27 oz AP-T) shell. Its muzzle velocity was still considerable, but its rate of fire was only 400 rounds per minute. The weapon's considerable recoil and waste gases were problematic for turbojet fighter aircraft, as was finding space for the gun and a useful amount of ammunition, but a single shell was often sufficient to destroy a bomber.

The N-37 was used in the MiG-9, MiG-15, MiG-17, and early MiG-19 fighters, the Yakovlev Yak-25, and others. Production lasted through the late 1950s, although it remained in service for many years afterwards.

Variants

N-37
Basic version without muzzle brake

N-37D
N-37 with muzzle brake

N-37L
N-37 with 1950mm long barrel (had no muzzle brake)

NN-37
Improved N-37L developed during the late 1950s for the Yak-27 reconnaissance aircraft. The NN-37 differed from the N-37L in having a pneumatic counter-recoil accelerator, therefore achieving a rate of fire of 600–700rpm. The ammunition feed mechanism was redesigned as well on this version.

Type 37 aircraft cannon
Chinese licensed / copy production

Production
The Soviet archives detail the following production numbers by year:
 1947 — 518
 1948 — 508
 1949 — 1,314
 1950 — 3,043
 1951 — 3,885
 1952 — 4,433
 1953 — 4,600
 1954 — 1,700
 1956 — 285

Comparable Weapons
M4 cannon

See also
List of Russian weaponry

References

Bibliography

 Широкорад А.Б. (2001) История авиационного вооружения Харвест (Shirokorad A.B. (2001) Istorya aviatsionnogo vooruzhenia Harvest. ) (History of aircraft armament)

External links

37 mm artillery
Autocannons of the Soviet Union
Aircraft guns of the Soviet Union
KB Tochmash products
Weapons and ammunition introduced in 1946